Mercy Aigbe   (born 1 January 1978) is a Nigerian actress, director, fashionista and businesswoman. She is best known for her Yoruba indigenous movies.

Early life
Mercy Aigbe was born on 1 January 1978 in Edo State. to Pa Aigbe and Mrs. Abisola Grace Owodunni She hails from Benin city which is the capital of Edo State. She is the second child in a family of five. She had her primary education at St. Francis primary school and attended Maryland Comprehensive Secondary School Ikeja, Lagos. She is also an alumnus of The Polytechnic, Ibadan, Oyo State, where she received her OND in Financial Studies. In 2001, Mercy Aigbe graduated from University of Lagos with a degree in Theater Arts.

Career
Mercy Aigbe kicked off her acting career by starring in some soap operas, including the popular TV drama series "Papa Ajasco." Professionally, Mercy joined the Nollywood industry fully in 2006 and acted in the movie that brought her into the limelight  'Ara,' a movie produced by Remi Olupo in Ibadan, Oyo State. She founded "Mercy Aigbe Gentry School of Drama" in 2016.

Endorsement

In November 2014, Mercy Aigbe was made the brand ambassador for Elephant Gold Rice. Mercy Aigbe signed a one-year deal to be the brand ambassador for Prestige Cosmetic in June 2015. In July 2016, Mercy signed an endorsement deal with Edalaf Brother Limited, an IT solution company. She was made an ambassador for a fitness company called "Shape you," the company that produces Slimming Coffee in October 2016. Mercy Aigbe, in March 2017, was made the brand ambassador for BK hair. In September 2018, She was made the brand ambassador for "Naija Taxi Services", a company that deals with transportation of people. Mercy Aigbe alongside Bose Alao and Biodun Okeowo penned an endorsement deal with a Cosmetic giant "Mary Make"

Filmography
Satanic
Afefe Ife (2008)
Okanjua (2008)
Atunida Leyi (2009) 
Igberaga (2009)
Ihamo (2009)
Ìpèsè (2009) 
Iró funfun (2009)
Mafisere (2009)
Oju ife (2009)
Omoge Osas (2012)
Ile Oko Mii (2014)
Victims (2015)
The Screenplay (2017)
Little Drops of Happy (2017)
200 Million (2018)
Second Acts (2018)
Lagos Real Fake Life (2018)
Swallow (2021)
Crazy GranniesObsessions (2022 film)Awards

 Fashion and style 
Mercy Aigbe is known for her unique style and dressing. At the 2016 Africa Magic Viewers Choice Awards, Mercy Aigbe's dress earned her great applause from fashion stakeholders, and she trended on social media even after the ceremony. The dress was commended for its unique design. In November 2014, Aigbe launched her clothing store, Mag Divas Boutique in Lagos, then opened another outlet in Ibadan. She was awarded Fashion Entrepreneur of The Year'' at Links and Glitz World Awards.

Personal life
Her first marriage ended due to the interference of her mother-in-law. In 2013, Aigbe married a Nigerian hotelier, Lanre Gentry, and has two children. In 2017, she shared photos of herself after allegedly being assaulted by her husband. She consequently separated from her husband due to claims of domestic violence, and started a campaign against it. Mercy Aigbe acquired a multi-million naira new mansion in 2018.

In 2022, she married Kazim Adeoti, popularly known as Adekaz.

See also
List of Nigerian actors

References

External links 
 

1978 births
Living people
Nigerian film producers
University of Lagos alumni
Nigerian fashion businesspeople
Actresses in Yoruba cinema
21st-century Nigerian actresses
Actresses from Edo State
21st-century Nigerian businesswomen
21st-century Nigerian businesspeople
Nigerian film actresses
The Polytechnic, Ibadan alumni
Nigerian film directors
Yoruba actresses
Nigerian women film directors
Nigerian female models
Nigerian film award winners
Nigerian media personalities
Nigerian television personalities